These are the international rankings of Turkey.

Politics and Society

Economy

Education

Renewable Energy Rankings in the World

Cities
GaWC Inventory of World Cities, 1999: Istanbul is an Alpha-rank world city

Economy
 Bloomberg's Global Innovation Index 2019, ranked 49 out of 129 countries
 Credit Suisse Global Wealth Report 2019, ranked 27 out of 189 countries
 Global Food Security Index 2017, ranked 41 out of 113 countries
 Observatory of Economic Complexity GDP Growth 2008-2018, ranked 19 out of 196 countries
 World Bank Logistics Performance Index 2018, ranked 47 out of 160
 World Economic Forum Global Enabling Trade Report 2014, ranked 46 out of 138 countries

Mineral Commodities

Agriculture

Environmental
Yale University: Environmental Sustainability Index 2005, ranked 91 out of 146 countries

References

See also
Lists of countries
Lists by country
List of international rankings

Turkey
Lists of countries by production